Mesagne is a railway station in the Italian town of Mesagne, in the Province of Brindisi, Apulia.

Overview
The station lies on the Taranto–Brindisi railway and was opened on 25 August 1886. The train services are operated by Trenitalia. The station also serves San Donaci and San Pancrazio Salentino.

The station is on the list Pegasus of 101 stations to be modernised in 2016.

Train services
The station is served by the following service(s):

 Regional trains: Lecce - Brindisi - Mesagne - Francavilla Fontana - Taranto

See also
Railway stations in Italy
List of railway stations in Apulia
Rail transport in Italy
History of rail transport in Italy

External links

Railway stations in Apulia
Railway stations opened in 1886
Buildings and structures in the Province of Brindisi
1886 establishments in Italy
Railway stations in Italy opened in the 19th century